The 1901–02 season was the seventh competitive season in Belgian football.

Overview
Only one official division existed at the time, split into two leagues.  It was called Coupe de Championnat (Championship Cup) and its winner was decided after a final round between the first two of each league, for the first time in the championship history.

The season was not completed in Championship Cup A, and Skill F.C. de Bruxelles withdrew at the end of the season. No teams were admitted.

Honour

League Tables

Championship Cup A

Championship Cup B

Final round

Test match

|}

External links
RSSSF archive - Final tables 1895-2002
Belgian clubs history